

Eberhard Thunert (22 November 1899 – 4 May 1964) was a German general during World War II who commanded the 1st Panzer Division. He was a recipient of the Knight's Cross of the Iron Cross.

Awards and decorations

 German Cross in Gold (24 January 1943)
 Knight's Cross of the Iron Cross on 1 February 1945 as Generalmajor and commander of 1 Panzer-Division

References

Citations

Bibliography

 
 

1899 births
1964 deaths
Lieutenant generals of the German Army (Wehrmacht)
German Army personnel of World War I
Prussian Army personnel
Recipients of the Gold German Cross
Recipients of the Knight's Cross of the Iron Cross
German prisoners of war in World War II held by the United States
People from Chełmża
People from West Prussia
Reichswehr personnel
German Army generals of World War II